Dulles Corrdidor may refer to:

 Dulles Technology Corridor
 Dulles Corridor Metrorail Project
 Dulles Corridor Users Group
 Dulles Toll Road